Jay's Journal is a book presented as an autobiographical account of a depressed teenage boy who becomes involved with a Satanic group. After participating in several occult rituals, "Jay" believes he is being haunted by a demon named Raul. The book was edited and written by Beatrice Sparks, and is based partly on the life of 16-year-old Alden Barrett from Pleasant Grove, Utah, who died by suicide in 1971. Critics allege Sparks misrepresented Barrett's life and experiences.

Response
Some critics have challenged the authenticity of the story, noting that the editor of this book, Beatrice Sparks, has filled the same role on many other "actual, anonymous diaries of teenagers" that explore such sensational themes as drug addiction, teenage pregnancy, and prostitution. These books, the most well-known of which is Go Ask Alice, serve as cautionary tales.

According to a book written by Barrett's brother Scott (A Place in the Sun: The Truth Behind Jay's Journal) and interviews with the family, Sparks used 21 entries of 212 total from Barrett's actual journal. The other entries were fictional, with Sparks claiming they were based on case histories from other teenagers Sparks worked with and interviews of friends and acquaintances of Barrett.

Within the city of Pleasant Grove, Jay's Journal has been the source of many urban legends, including alleged locations where Jay performed actions described in the book, his home, the effect on his family after his death, and other rumors.

Due to allegations of ritual cattle mutilation arising in Jay's Journal, the book came to the attention of Royal Canadian Mounted Police officers investigating reports of killed and mutilated cows in Alberta.

Adaptations
A rock opera titled A Place in the Sun was created and performed in 1997 by Utah band Grain. According to some of Alden's family members, it was a more accurate portrayal and showed Sparks' alleged exploitation of the story.

References

External links
  Blog entry on the "Mormon Horror Fiction" of Jay's Journal
 Review of Grain's A Place in the Sun rock opera
 Debunking by Snopes of the anti-drug tale Go Ask Alice, also written by Beatrice Sparks.

1978 books
Fictional diaries
Works by Beatrice Sparks
Written fiction presented as fact
Satanism in popular culture